Kaňovice may refer to places in the Czech Republic:

Kaňovice (Frýdek-Místek District), a municipality and village in the Moravian-Silesian Region
Kaňovice (Zlín District), a municipality and village in the Zlín Region